WDKL  may refer to:

 WDKL (FM), a radio station (102.7 FM) licensed to Mount Clemens, Michigan, United States
 WUKL (FM), a radio station  (106.9 FM) licensed to Masontown, Pennsylvania, United States, which used the call signs WDKL from 2015 until 2018
 WKTZ-FM, a radio station  (95.9 FM) licensed to Loch Lynn Heights, Maryland, United States, which used the call signs WDKL from 2002 until 2015